Oxford Research Group (ORG) was a London-based charity and think tank at 244–254 Cambridge Heath Road, London, E2 9DA, working on peace, security and justice issues. Its research and dialogue activities were mainly focused on the Middle East, North and West Africa, as well as influencing UK and international security policy.

History
ORG was founded in 1982 by Scilla Elworthy and a group of academics and activists with an interest in the psychological dimensions of international security decision-making. While established in sympathy with Quaker values of peace and social justice, ORG is an independent, secular group without affiliation to any religious or political group. ORG is not a pacifist group in that it recognises that there are legitimate roles and uses for armed forces. Rather, it defines its mission as to enlarge the space for non-military alternatives to prevent and manage conflict. It was registered as a charity in England and Wales in 1988.

Initially, the Group focused on dialogue between British nuclear decision-makers and nuclear disarmament activists, widening its activities to incorporate the other P5 nuclear weapons states, India and Pakistan. For this work, ORG and Elworthy were nominated for the Nobel Peace Prize in 1988, 1989 and 1991. In the 1990s, ORG fostered security dialogue between the UK and China on a broader range of issues.

In 2006 ORG relocated from Oxfordshire to London. Since 2001, it has focused particularly on analysing the causes, consequences and character of the War on Terror, promoting more sustainable approaches to international security policy, investigating the changing nature and technologies of warfare, mediating track II dialogues around conflicts in the Middle East, and recording the casualties of armed conflict.

In 2020 ORG announced that due to funding issues it would cease operations at the end of the year. It would re-home some of its programmes elsewhere.

Work
ORG had three thematic programmes and has served as host or incubator for several other projects.

Programmes
The Sustainable Security Programme aimed to highlight the limitations of orthodox security policy that seeks to contain the symptoms of deeper conflict and to develop policy alternatives that address such underlying drivers as marginalisation, militarisation, climate change and resource scarcity.

The Strategic Peacebuilding Programme was ORG’s conflict resolution programme. It deployed a unique methodology to build the capacity of local partners to engage in strategic dialogue towards lasting political settlements. Formerly the Middle East Programme, it has brokered a series of Track II dialogues in Israel, Palestine and Egypt and between Iran, Saudi Arabia, Syria and other states. The programme uses a strategic thinking methodology based in ‘radical disagreement’ theory to develop strategies for alternative routes to peaceful co-existence.

The Remote Warfare Programme was established in January 2018, based around the Remote Control project of the Network for Social Change, which had been hosted by ORG since 2013. It analyses shifts in military engagements, focusing on Western states’ increasing focus on working through local and regional partner militaries in places such as the Middle East and Africa. As part of this, they examine current developments in military technology and doctrine such as cyber-warfare, unmanned weapons systems (such as unmanned aerial vehicles), private military and security contractors, and special operations forces.

Incubation
Peace Direct was developed within ORG in 2002 as a project developing links to local peacebuilding organisations in a number of fragile or conflict-affected states, and became a separate organisation in the following year.

Every Casualty Worldwide was developed as a programme of ORG between 2007 and 2014. It aimed to enhance the technical, legal and institutional capacity, as well as the political will, for every single casualty of armed conflict throughout the world to be recorded. It became a separate NGO in October 2014.

The Oxford Process was established in early 2017 to focus on the discreet high-level dialogues that ORG had facilitated over the previous 15 years under Gabrielle Rifkind. It describes its approach as preventive diplomacy to manage radical differences.

Honours and awards
ORG’s founder, Scilla Elworthy, was awarded the Niwano Peace Prize in 2003 for ORG's work on the promotion of disarmament and non-violent methods for resolving conflict.

Notable current and former staff and associates
 Lord John Alderdice
 Prof Frank Barnaby
 Major General Patrick Cordingley
 Hamit Dardagan (co-founder of Iraq Body Count)
 Dr Scilla Elworthy (founder)
 Paul Hilder
 Prof Khaled Hroub
 Paul Ingram
 Tim Livesey
 General David Ramsbotham
 Prof Oliver Ramsbotham
 Gabrielle Rifkind
 Dr Nick Ritchie
 Prof Paul Rogers
 Salman Shaikh (Director of Brookings Doha Center)
 Prof John Sloboda (co-founder of Iraq Body Count)

Patrons
 Dr Hans Blix
 Dr Scilla Elworthy
 Archbishop Desmond Tutu
 Baroness Shirley Williams

References

External links
 Official website (at archive.org, January 2021)
 Sustainable Security blog
 Every Casualty website
 Remote Control Project website

1982 establishments in England
Peace organisations based in the United Kingdom
Foreign policy and strategy think tanks based in the United Kingdom
Charities based in London
2020 disestablishments in England